A direttissima (Italian for "shortest link") is a climbing term meaning a direct climb to the summit of a mountain up the fall line from the valley base to the top. Whilst the normal route aims to find the way with the least difficulty, the climber attempting a direttissima faces the challenge of ascending the mountain in a more "direct" way.

Definition
The term stems from Italian climber, Emilio Comici, who said: "I wish some day to make a route, and from the summit let fall a drop of water, and this is where my route will have gone"

There are usually many climbing routes to the summit of a mountain and it often takes days of studying to work out which route might be suitable.

Sometimes the theoretical considerations turn out to be impracticable or inexpedient in hindsight. But the alpinist who decides to climb a mountain peak or rock face direttissima may only depart slightly from the vertical line to the summit during his ascent.

History
Reinhold Messner wrote that diretissimas "always existed - so long as the mountain permits it", but in the 1960s they "infiltrated the entire field of climbing" due to the advance of drilling bolts and other equipment. In 1971, he stated "People are drilling more and more and climbing less and less."

The pursuit of direttissima routes lost its importance since at least the 1980s as the emphasis switched to the different styles of climbing, such as redpoint, on-sight and flash.

Examples
There are many direttissime that will probably never be climbed, one of which is (not least because of avalanche risk), the direttissima of the East Face of the Kangshung on Mount Everest.

A famous direttissima in Europe is the vertical route up the Eiger North Face which is reserved for very experienced climbers.

References 

Mountaineering
Climbing